Thirudargal Jakkirathai is a 1958 Indian Tamil-language film directed by B. Narasimha Rao. The film stars S. S. Rajendran and G. Varalakshmi. It was simultaneously produced in Telugu with the title Dongalunnaru Jagratha. The film was released on 11 July 1958.

Plot

Cast 
List adapted from the database of Film News Anandan

Male cast
S. S. Rajendran
T. S. Balaiah
V. K. Ramasamy
T. K. Ramachandran
Duraisamy

Female cast
G. Varalakshmi
Girija

Telugu version
C. S. R. Anjaneyulu
Jaggayya

Production 
The film was produced by G. Krishnamoorthi and directed by B. Narasimha Rao. This film was simultaneously produced in Telugu with the title Dongalunnaru Jagratha with a different cast.

Soundtrack 
Music was composed by K. V. Mahadevan while the lyrics were penned by Thanjai N. Ramaiah Dass, A. Maruthakasi and Kannadasan.

References

External links 

1950s multilingual films
1950s Tamil-language films
1950s Telugu-language films
Films scored by K. V. Mahadevan
Indian black-and-white films
Indian multilingual films